The Three Stooges Go Around the World in a Daze is the fifth feature film made by The Three Stooges after their 1959 resurgence in popularity. By this time, the trio consisted of Moe Howard, Larry Fine, and Joe DeRita (dubbed "Curly Joe"). Directed by Howard's son-in-law Norman Maurer, the film was loosely based on the Jules Verne classic Around the World in Eighty Days.

Plot
Phileas Fogg III (Jay Sheffield), great-grandson of the original Phileas Fogg, accepts a bet to duplicate his great-grandfather's famous trip around the world in response to a challenge made by Randolph Stuart III, the descendant of the original Fogg's nemesis. Unbeknownst to anyone, however, "Stuart" is the infamous con man Vicker Cavendish (Peter Forster) who made the bet in order to cover up his robbing the bank of England by framing Fogg for the crime.

With him in this plot is his weaselly Cockney co-conspirator Filch (Walter Burke). This makes for a dangerous journey for Fogg and his servants (the Stooges) and Amelia Carter (Joan Freeman), whom they rescue from thugs during a train ride. On the way, they also: try to steal a cream pie from the galley of a Turkey-bound British cargo ship (and poke the cook in his fat behind with a gaff in the process); watch an elaborate Indian dance at a maharajah's palace, where blind-as-a-bat Curly Joe also regales the maharajah and the viceroy with knife throwing—until his disguise falls off; get captured in China by the Chinese Army, and survive Communist brainwashing in Shanghai with their interrogators turning into Chinese Stooge clones (Moe tells the Chinese general, "No brainee to washee!"). The disgusted Chinese set them adrift in a small boat; use Curly Joe's music-provoked strength to cadge food, clothes, and a trip to San Francisco from the manager of the monstrous sumo Itchy Kitchy (Iau Kea) after a demonstration in a park in Tokyo; stow away in a moving van, supposedly headed for New York. Of course, they are caught, and arrested in Canada by the British inspector (the Stooges and Amelia fake British accents so the inspector will arrest them too).

Back in London, they cross paths again with the two conspirators, again disguised as police—and armed. Of course, the Stooges win out, and, as with the original Phileas Fogg, his descendant miscalculated by one day and still has a chance. Curly Joe gets behind the wheel of the Bobbies' paddy wagon and speeds across London, and young Fogg wins the bet—crashing into the Reformer's Club with two seconds to spare.

Cast
Moe Howard as Moe
Larry Fine as Larry
Joe DeRita as Curly Joe
Jay Sheffield as Phileas Fogg III
Joan Freeman as Amelia Carter
Walter Burke as Lory Filch
Peter Forster as Vickers Cavendish/"Stuart"
Maurice Dallimore as Inspector J. B. Crotchet
Richard Devon as Maharajah
Anthony Eustrel as Kandu
Iau Kea as Itchi Kitchi
Robert Kino as Charlie Okuma
Phil Arnold as Referee
Emil Sitka as Butler at Reformer's Club
Laurie Main as a member of the Reformer's Club

References

External links 
 
 
 The Three Stooges Go Around the World in a Daze at threestooges.net

1963 films
1960s English-language films
1963 comedy films
American black-and-white films
Columbia Pictures films
Films set in San Francisco
Films set in London
Films based on Around the World in Eighty Days
The Three Stooges films
Films directed by Norman Maurer
1960s American films